Rapo or Räpo may refer to

Place
Räpo, Võru Parish, Estonia

Surname
Donald Rapo (born 1990), Albanian footballer
Erkki Rapo (1946–2004), Finnish amateur autograph collector
Eric Rapo (born 1972), Swiss footballer
Marco Rapo (born 1978), Italian football manager

See also
Dušan Rapoš (born in 1953), Slovak film director